"Phineas and Ferb Get Busted!" (broadcast outside the United States and Canada as "At Last") is the 45th broadcast episode of the first season of the animated television series Phineas and Ferb. The episode aired on Disney XD in the United States on February 16, 2009. The episode follows Phineas and Ferb finally being caught by Phineas' mother (and Ferb's father) and sent to a reform school, where a harsh and cruel sergeant attempts to destroy their imagination by sitting them down to a commercial about good boys that mind-controlled them. Candace goes to save them after she sees a news report about their horrible condition.

The episode's story was written by the writing team Martin Olson and Bobby Gaylor and constructed into storyboard by Jon Colton Barry and Piero Piluso. Dan Povenmire, co-creator of Phineas and Ferb, directed it. Talk show personality Geraldo Rivera and veteran actor Clancy Brown guest star as television reporter Morty Williams and the school sergeant, respectively.

Characters

Candace's Dream
 Phineas Flynn 
 Baljeet Tjinder
 Ferb Fletcher 
 Other kids
 Candace Flynn 
 Unnamed sergeant

Perry's dream 
 Phineas Flynn 
 Linda Flynn-Fletcher
 Ferb Fletcher 
 Lawrence Fletcher
 Candace Flynn 
 Major Monogram

In real life
 Phineas Flynn
 Perry

Plot
Phineas and Ferb rebuild their mother's station wagon into a flying car, called the "Flying Car of the Future, Today", and build a giant tower. Candace shows Linda (this time successful), who is furious, and Phineas confesses that they've been doing similar things all summer. The tower collapses, destroying part of the house. Linda and Lawrence send the boys to the "Smile Away Reformatory School" run by a drill sergeant, unaware that it is a prison where kids are brainwashed to remove their creativity.

Candace enjoys fun activities with Stacy and Jeremy, but after a few days is bored and haunted by the sad consequences of busting Phineas and Ferb, realizing that she loves her brothers for their genius skills. She and Jeremy take the flying car to save her brothers, disguised as reporter Morty Williams and his cameraman. She secretly tells Phineas and Ferb to escape with them.

At the flying car, they see Linda and Lawrence, but the sergeant arrives to put Candace and Jeremy in the school as well. With a giant robot spider, Dr. Doofenshmirtz and Perry the Platypus knock the sergeant off the cliff to his death. Phineas and Ferb are juggling corn dogs, Linda and Lawrence turn into marionettes controlled by a giant Baljeet, who turns into one as well, controlled by a talking zebra, and Jeremy proposes to Candace.

It turns out it was all Candace's dream all along and that the events of the episode never happened, which she tells her family at breakfast, even revealing Perry's secret identity. Major Monogram bursts in with an army of O.W.C.A. (Organization Without a Cool Acronym) agents to relocate Perry and mind-erase the Fletchers and Flynns.

A whimpering Perry wakes up in Phineas's bed, the events of the entire episode having all been just a bad dream and didn't really happen at all. Phineas reassures him, telling him to go back to sleep, which they both do.

Production

"Phineas and Ferb Get Busted!" was written by Bobby Gaylor and Martin Olson as a story, but the storyboards were adapted and constructed by Jon Colton Barry and Piero Piluso. Robert F. Hughes and Zac Moncrief as well are apple credited for additionally writing for the episode. Dan Povenmire, the show's co-creator and executive producer, directed the episode.

The episode is titled "At Last" when broadcast outside the United States and Canada. Latin America labels the episode name in its end credits for the episode, despite entitling it "Al Fin"; however, "Al Fin" literally translates to "At Last."

Geraldo Rivera guest starred as the voice of investigative talk show host Morty Williams. Clancy Brown, known for his work in The Shawshank Redemption, and SpongeBob SquarePants provided the voice of the drill sergeant. "Phineas and Ferb Get Busted" was originally broadcast in America as the premiere of season two on Presidents' Day, February 16, 2009, on Disney XD, at 4:30 PM Eastern/Pacific Time. It was followed by first season reruns aired in a marathon.

The YouTube channel WatchMojo ranked it at number 10 in their video “The Top 20 Unexpectedly Dark Episodes in Kids Cartoons”, saying “Imagination is a wonderful thing to have, though not everyone would agree, as seen in Disney’s hit cartoon, “Phineas and Ferb”. In this episode, Candace finally catches the titular pair in performing their usual dangerous antics, leading them to get sent to reform school. The story takes a dark turn when the pair have their imaginations forcibly removed from their brains through intense brainwashing, a concept that gets even darker considering it serves as a disturbing metaphor for growing up. Though the whole thing turned out to be a dream, that didn’t save the episode from being incredibly dark.”

Cultural references
The scene where Phineas and Ferb are strapped to seats and have their eyes forced open to watch films that attempt to destroy their imagination is a direct parody of the film A Clockwork Orange; in the latter, a young man is held down in the same fashion, being forced to watch acts of violence to rid himself of his own violent tendencies. 
While Candace and Jeremy are driving the "Flying Car of the Future, Today", a riff from the Back to the Future theme plays in the background. 
The Smile Away Reformatory School is based on Alcatraz from the 1979 film, Escape from Alcatraz.
The scene where Candace wakes up and realizes that her successful busting and rescue of her brothers was all just a dream is a reference to the television series Dallas, where Pam Ewing wakes up and realizes that her husband Bobby being killed was just a dream. Perry the Platypus also had the same reference at the end of the episode.

Reception
When the episode broadcast on Disney Channel on March 13, 2009, it garnered a total of 3.7 million viewers, 1.4 million of them ages 9–14. It was the series second most watched telecast, behind only "Flop Starz," and was the top-rated for Kids 6-11 in almost 6 months, ranking in Phineas and Ferb's top four most watched in the category. Moreover, it was the day's most watched in Tweens 9-14 and Kids 6-11 and the most watched for cable television in total viewers.

Matt Blum of Wired wrote about the episode, "if it’s any indication, the second season will be even more brilliant than the first season was." Blum as well praised the appearance of Clancy Brown as a guest actor. One of the songs in the episode, "Little Brothers" was voted #4 on Phineas and Ferb's Musical Cliptastic Countdown.

References

External links

Official Phineas and Ferb website

Phineas and Ferb episodes
2009 American television episodes
Television episodes about nightmares